John Reid (13 April 1874 – 14 January 1948) was a South African cricket umpire. He stood in one Test match, South Africa vs. England, in 1923.

See also
 List of Test cricket umpires

References

1874 births
1948 deaths
Place of birth missing
South African Test cricket umpires